The Amelia Project is a fiction podcast created by Philip Thorne and Øystein Ulsberg, starring Julia Morizawa and Alan Burgon, and produced by Imploding Fictions and The Fable and Folly Network.

Background 
The story follows a company that fakes their clients' deaths. Each episode is 20 to 30 minutes long. The show had released three seasons by March 2021. The podcast was written and directed by Philip Thorne and Øystein Ulsberg.

Main cast 
 Alan Burgon as The Interviewer
 Julia C. Thorne as Alvina
 Julia Morizawa as Amelia
 Gianluca Iumiento as Joey
 Ravdeep Singh Bajwa as Salvatore
 Benjamin Noble as Haines
 Torgny G. Aanderaa as Cole

Reception 
Wil Williams wrote in The A. V. Club that the podcast is "bizarre, hilarious, and energetic." Natalie Zutter wrote on Tor.com that the podcast is like a "comforting mug of cocoa to curl your hands around." Sean Keeley wrote in The Comeback that the podcast has an "old-timey tone and intriguing premise." Sarah Hemming wrote in the Financial Times that "This droll black comedy is best consumed with a cup of cocoa." The podcast had a 4.8 out of 5 stars on Apple Podcasts in December 2021.

Awards

References

External links 
 

Audio podcasts
2017 podcast debuts
Fantasy podcasts
Scripted podcasts
Science fiction podcasts
Patreon creators